Hanna Hryhorivna Mashutina (July 20, 1981 – January 24, 2011), known under her pseudonyms  Anna Yablonskaya or Hanna Yablonska, was a Ukrainian playwright and poet, and one of the victims of the 2011 Domodedovo International Airport bombing.

Profile
Yablonska was born in Odessa, Ukrainian SSR (now Ukraine). Under the pseudonym Anna Yablonskaya she published over a dozen Russian-language playscripts. Many of them were staged at venues in Russia, in particular, in St. Petersburg. Since 2004 Yablonska received several awards in different literary and dramatic events in Russia (Moscow, Yekaterinburg) and Belarus (Minsk). She also wrote a series of lyrical poems.

On January 24, 2011 Yablonska arrived at Domodedovo International Airport in Moscow on a flight from Odessa, Ukraine to attend the presentation ceremony as one of the 2010 winners of the award established by the Cinema Art magazine. She was subsequently killed when a suicide vest or improvised explosive device detonated in the international baggage-claim area.

References

External links
 Respect those who died at Domodedovo — a tribute to Anna Yablonskaya by Natalia Antonova in The Guardian article.

1981 births
2011 deaths
Ukrainian dramatists and playwrights
Ukrainian people murdered abroad
Ukrainian terrorism victims
Ukrainian writers in Russian
Writers from Odesa
Terrorism deaths in Russia
Ukrainian women poets
Women dramatists and playwrights
21st-century dramatists and playwrights
21st-century Ukrainian women writers
21st-century Ukrainian poets
Ukrainian poets in Russian
20th-century Ukrainian poets
20th-century Ukrainian women writers